This article lists events that occurred during 2006 in Estonia.

Incumbents
President – Arnold Rüütel (until 9 October); Toomas Hendrik Ilves (starting 9 October)
Prime Minister – Andrus Ansip

Events
17 February – Kumu was established.
13 July – Viru Prison was established.
25 November – political party Estonian Greens was established.

Births

Deaths

See also
 2006 in Estonian television

References

 
2000s in Estonia
Estonia
Estonia
Years of the 21st century in Estonia